The Valdostan Rally (Rassemblement Valdôtain, RV) was a conservative Italian political party active in Aosta Valley.

In 1963 a group of conservative members of the Valdostan Union formed the Valdostan Independent Rally (RIV) and won 3.3% of the vote in a regional election. In 1967 RIV merged with other conservative groups in order to form RV. Under the new name the party won 5.4% of the vote in the 1968 regional election and 1.6% in 1973. During all its lifetime the party was a minor ally of Christian Democracy in the Region.

On January 1, 1977, RIV (with its regional councilor Maria Ida) and the two regional councilors of the Progressive Valdostan Union merged into the UV.

References 

Political parties in Aosta Valley
Conservative parties in Italy
Christian democratic parties in Italy